Arthur Granville Bradley (11 November 1850, Rugby, Warwickshire – 11 January 1943) was a British historian and an author of numerous books. His father was George Granville Bradley, Dean of Westminster.

Biography
A. G. Bradley was educated at Marlborough College and Trinity College, Cambridge. He spent several years farming in Virginia. Upon his return to England, he became a colonial agent in Westminster. From 1897 to 1926 he was a prolific author of books. In 1874 he married a surgeon's daughter Florence Rackham; they had one daughter.

Works

References

External links

 
 

1850 births
1943 deaths
19th-century English historians
20th-century English historians
People educated at Marlborough College
Alumni of Trinity College, Cambridge